Adagalale  is a village in the southern state of Karnataka, India. It is located in the Sagara taluka of Shimoga district in Karnataka. The people of Adagalale mainly depends on agriculture, the crops are paddy and Areca nut.

HOW TO REACH Adagalale

By Rail 
Sagara Jambagaru Rail Way Station is the very nearby railway stations to Adagalale. Sagara Jambagaru Rail Way Station (near to Sagar), Shiroor Rail Way Station (near to Bhatkal), Bhatkal Rail Way Station (near to Bhatkal) are the Rail way stations reachable from near by towns.

By Road 
Sagar , Jog Falls , Bhatkal are the nearby by towns to Adagalale having road connectivity to Adagalale

Colleges near Adagalale 
Government PU college, Tumari

Lal Bahadur Arts, Science And S.b., Solabanna Shetty Commerce College

Address : Sagar District, shimoga Karnataka

See also
 Shimoga
 Districts of Karnataka

References

External links
 http://Shimoga.nic.in/

Villages in Shimoga district